Eupithecia eurytera is a moth in the  family Geometridae. It is found in China.

References

Moths described in 1938
eurytera
Moths of Asia